The Colt Group is a family owned business, founded in 1931, that designs and supplies climate control, smoke control, natural ventilation, solar shading, as well as providing service and maintenance for these systems.

The company is present in over 75 countries around the world through subsidiaries, license and joint venture agreements. The Colt Group's headquarters  are in Waterlooville, United Kingdom. The Group has manufacturing sites in the UK, the Netherlands, Germany, Saudi Arabia and China. It has approximately 1000 employees and an annual turnover of GBP 180 Million (2017). Chief Executive Officer is Mark Oliver.

History 
Colt was founded in 1931 by Jack O’Hea in London. In the 1930s Colt's principal business activity was the development of ventilators for industry. During the Second World War Colt developed a series of blackout ventilators to ensure ventilation could take place in blacked out buildings.

In 1945 the UK Government started a massive rehousing programme using prefabricated houses. These houses were designed without fireplaces to save space, which created the need for an alternative source of ventilation. Colt designed its Constant Flow ventilator to meet this need.

The post-war years also saw the reconstruction of the British manufacturing industry and the erection of new factory buildings across the country. At this time, Colt designed the Sloping Roof ventilator, which lay along the roof slope, reducing installation and maintenance costs. Colt also designed the Clear Opening ventilator for industrial buildings such as foundries. This ventilator design ensured cooler working conditions and natural daylighting inside the factories.

In the 1950s, the advent of large single-storey industrial buildings in the automotive sector required a new approach to fire safety. In 1954 Colt designed and installed the world’s first smoke ventilation system at the Vauxhall factory in Luton, UK. Colt has since sponsored and participated in research programmes to develop the science of smoke control.

In the 1960s Colt began to expand operations to continental Europe, initially through a joint venture in the Netherlands. In the following decades the company has continued to expand into many new markets.

In 1978 the O’Hea family gave Colt shares to establish the Colt Foundation, a registered charity that funds research projects in the field of occupational and environmental health, especially those aimed at discovering the causes of illnesses arising from conditions in the workplace. In its first 33 years of operation it has awarded more than £13.5 million in grants to over 200 projects and supported around 220 students.

In the 1980s Colt adapted its ventilation products to commercial buildings and entered the solar shading market. In the 1990s the company invested in research in the control of daylighting levels and solar power. This led to the design of Shadovoltaic, a combined solar shading, daylighting and electricity generating system for facades and roofs of buildings. In 1990 Colt designed, built and installed the distinctive steel pyramid on top of the skyscraper at One Canada Square in Canary Wharf.

In 2007 Colt purchased Bomin Solar, a company specialising in sunshading and daylighting systems.

Colt participated in the design of the world's first microalgae-based bioreactor facade. Its installation at the BIQ house  at the International Building Exhibition in Hamburg was completed 23 March 2013. This is part of pilot project to showcase a bioreactive façade and is the result of three years of research and development by Colt based on a bio-reactor concept developed by SSC Ltd and design work by Arup with funding support from the German Government's "Forschungsinitiative ZukunftBau"  research initiative. The photo bioreactive façade won the Zumtobel Group Award 2014 in the Applied Innovations category.

In 2014 Colt expanded its range of evaporative cooling systems with the launch of a new rooftop that combines cooling, heating, heat recovery, air filtration and ventilation. The company also invested in increasing production efficiency at its manufacturing facility in China and extended the range of products manufactured at the plant to serve customers in China, Australia, Asia and the Middle East.

Recent awards 
Red Dot: Best of the Best Award - 2017 - for Colt’s Coltlite Ventilator.
BAKA Low Energy Systems Award - 2015 - for Colt’s ClimaTower.
Zumbobel Group Award - Applied innovations - 2014 for Colt’s bioreactor facade 
ROSPA President's Award - 2014 - Royal Society for the Prevention of Accidents (UK) award in recognition of Colt having won the ROSPA Gold Medal Award for 10 consecutive years.

Products and services 
Smoke control (including fire ventilation, smoke extraction, car park ventilation, corridor ventilation, staircase ventilation, pressurisation systems, smoke containment)
Climate control (including  HVAC systems and acoustic louvres)
Natural ventilation
Solar shading (including sun protection louvres, brise soleil, glass louvres, aluminium louvres)
Cladding and performance louvres
Design support and project management
Servicing and maintenance
Training

References

External links
www.coltgroup.com Official Colt Group website
Coltinfo.uk: Colt Co. info

Design companies of the United Kingdom
Manufacturing companies of the United Kingdom
Design companies established in 1931
Manufacturing companies established in 1931
Renewable resource companies established in 1931
Privately held companies of the United Kingdom